Hangzhou Sanchao F.C. (Simplified Chinese: 杭州三超足球俱乐部) is a Chinese football club based in Hangzhou, China. This club is U-19 team of Zhejiang Greentown.

See also
Zhejiang Greentown

External links
official site

Defunct football clubs in China

Football clubs in China
Sport in Hangzhou
2007 establishments in China
Association football clubs established in 2007
Zhejiang Professional F.C.